Klára Förstner (born 29 April 1942) is a Hungarian gymnast. She competed in six events at the 1960 Summer Olympics.

References

1942 births
Living people
Hungarian female artistic gymnasts
Olympic gymnasts of Hungary
Gymnasts at the 1960 Summer Olympics
Gymnasts from Budapest